The 2016 USAC National Midget Championship is the 61st season of the USAC National Midget Championship. The series began with the Shamrock Classic at Southern Illinois Center on March 9, and ended with the Turkey Night Grand Prix at Perris Auto Speedway on November 24. Tracy Hines entered the season as the defending champion. 

The season was marred with tragedy after Bryan Clauson died from injuries sustained in a crash during Saturday's portion of the Belleville Midget Nationals. Tanner Thorson won the series championship driving for Keith Kunz/Curb-Agajanian Motorsports.

Schedule

Results and Standings

Races

References

USAC National Midget Series
United States Auto Club